René Snelders (13 October 1937 – 8 December 2022) was a Belgian footballer and businessman. He played as a defender.

He played during his career with Beerschot A.C. and Royal Antwerp FC. After his playing career, he was together with his business partner Jos Verhaegen a main person behind the success of Beerschot A.C.. With him as board member the club rose from a provincial football club to the Belgian Pro League in the 1980s. His son was footballer and coach Eddy Snelders and his grandson was footballer Kristof Snelders.

Snelders died in a residential care center on 8 December 2022, at the age of 85.

References

1937 births
2022 deaths
Belgian footballers
Belgian businesspeople
Belgian Pro League players
Beerschot A.C. players
Royal Antwerp F.C. players
Beerschot A.C. non-playing staff
Place of death missing